The 1978–79 season was Cardiff City F.C.'s 52nd season in the Football League. They competed in the 22-team Division Two, then the second tier of English football, finishing ninth.

During the season manager Jimmy Andrews, who had been in charge of the club for just over three years, left the club after several poor results and the disappointing hiring of Micky Burns as a player-coach. Andrews was replaced by Richie Morgan, a former player who had spent his entire professional playing career at the club before retiring in 1977 to joins the backroom staff.

Players

 

 

Source.

League standings

Results by round

Fixtures and results

Second Division

Source

League Cup

FA Cup

Welsh Cup

See also
Cardiff City F.C. seasons

References

Bibliography

Welsh Football Data Archive

Cardiff City F.C. seasons
Cardiff City F.C.
Card